Linalool synthase may refer to one of two enzymes:
R-linalool synthase
S-linalool synthase